Alec Mercer (12 September 1891–1977) was an English footballer who played in the Football League for Bury and Coventry City.

References

1891 births
1977 deaths
English footballers
Association football forwards
English Football League players
Bury F.C. players
Coventry City F.C. players
Kidderminster Harriers F.C. players
Tamworth F.C. players